21 at 33 is the fourteenth studio album by English musician Elton John and his 21st album in total, made when John was 33 years old, hence the title.

21 at 33 was recorded at Super Bear Studios, Nice, France, in September 1979 and at Rumbo Recorders and Sunset Sound in Los Angeles, California, from January to March 1980.  Three singles were released from the album, including "Little Jeannie", his highest-charting U.S. single in 5 years.

The album sold over 900,000 copies in the United States, missing a Platinum certification.

Background
The two other founding members of the original Elton John Band (active 1969–1975), drummer Nigel Olsson and bass player Dee Murray, reunited with him for two songs. His keyboardist James Newton Howard returned and performed on almost every track, as was the case on Rock of the Westies and Blue Moves. Other musicians included members of the Eagles and Toto, as well as Peter Noone from Herman's Hermits and Bill Champlin and Toni Tennille of Captain & Tennille.

The title is derived from the fact that this was John's 21st album and was recorded at the age of 33. According to the liner notes in the remastered edition of the album, the count includes thirteen previous studio albums, two greatest hits compilations, two live albums, as well as the soundtrack release Friends, the three-song 12-inch EP The Thom Bell Sessions and the UK-only rarities collection Lady Samantha.

John has not played any of the material in concert since touring in 1980, with the exception of "Little Jeannie", which, despite having been a huge North American hit (#3 Pop and #1 Adult Contemporary in the United States, and #1 in Canada), was included only in the two concerts from 2000 titled One Night Only, and the warm up gig for the two Madison Square Garden concerts in Wilkes-Barre, Pennsylvania.

Track listing

Side one

Side two

Eleven more songs, excluding the B-sides, were recorded during these sessions: five of which were "Heart in the Right Place", "Carla/Etude", "Fanfare", "Chloe" and "Elton's Song"; these would appear on John's next release, The Fox. Two other songs recorded were French-language duets with France Gall, entitled "Les Aveux" and "Donner Pour Donner", which were respectively released in France as the A-side and B-side of a 7" single. One song was "The Retreat" which was the B-side of the single "Princess" in 1982 and was later included as a bonus track on remastered version of the album Too Low for Zero. The other three songs were the B-sides for singles released from The Fox in 1981.

In 2003, Mercury/Universal and The Rocket Record Company reissued the album on CD, remastered by Gary Moore; the new line-up contained no bonus tracks.

Personnel 
Track numbering refers to CD and digital releases of the album.

 Elton John – lead vocals, backing vocals, acoustic piano (1, 3, 5, 6), overdubbed piano (1, 3, 5, 6, 8), Yamaha electric piano (4), Wurlitzer electric piano (8)
 James Newton Howard – Fender Rhodes (2, 6, 7), Yamaha CS-80 (2), electronic keyboards (3, 7), acoustic piano (9)
 David Paich – organ (6)
 Steve Lukather – electric guitar (1, 3, 4, 6, 7, 9)
 Richie Zito – acoustic guitar (2, 7), electric guitar (5, 8)
 Steve Wrather – electric guitar (7) 
 Reggie McBride – bass (1–4, 6–9) 
 Dee Murray – backing vocals (2), bass (5)
 Alvin Taylor – drums (1, 3, 4, 6–9)
 Nigel Olsson – drums (2, 5)
 Victor Feldman – tambourine (1, 3, 5, 9)
 Clive Franks – tambourine (4, 6), cowbell (4)
 Lenny Castro – congas (5, 9)
 Jim Horn – brass arrangements (2, 4), piccolo flute (2), alto saxophone (2), tenor saxophone (4)
 Richie Cannata – alto saxophone (7)
 Larry Williams – tenor saxophone (9)
  Chuck Findley – trombone (2, 4), trumpet (2, 4)
 Bill Reichenbach Jr. – trombone (9)
 Jerry Hey – flugelhorn (2, 9), trumpet (4, 9), brass arrangements (9)
 Larry Hall – trumpet (9), flugelhorn (9)
 Byron Berline – fiddle (8)
 David Foster – string arrangements (9)
 Venette Gloud – backing vocals (1, 3, 6, 9)
 Stephanie Spruill – backing vocals (1, 3, 6, 9)
 Carmen Twillie – backing vocals (1, 3, 6, 9)
 Bill Champlin – backing vocals (2, 9)
 Max Gronenthal – backing vocals (2)
 Glenn Frey – backing vocals (5)
 Don Henley – backing vocals (5)
 Timothy B. Schmit – backing vocals (5)
 Curt Becher – choir vocals (6)
 Joe Chemay – choir vocals (6)
 Bruce Johnston – choir arrangements (6), choir vocals (6)
 Jon Joyce – choir vocals (6)
 Peter Noone – choir vocals (6)
 Toni Tennille – choir vocals (6)

Production 
 Produced by Clive Franks and Elton John
 Engineers – Clive Franks, Steve Desper (Track 6), Patrick Jaunead (Tracks 1–4, 6–9).
 Second engineers – David Burgess (Tracks 1–4, 6–9), David Leonard, Peggy McCreary and Stephen McManus.
 Recorded at Super Bear Studios (Berre-les-Alpes, France); Rumbo Recorders and Sunset Sound Recorders (Los Angeles, CA).
 Mixed at Sunset Sound Recorders
 Mastered by Bernie Grundman at A&M Mastering Studio (Los Angeles, CA).
 Studio coordinator – Adrian Collee
 Art direction – George Osaki
 Design and concept – Norman Moore
 Photography – Jim Shea
 Management – John Reid Management, LTD.

Charts

Weekly charts

Year-end charts

Certifications

} 
 
}

References

External links

Elton John albums
1980 albums
Albums produced by Elton John
MCA Records albums
The Rocket Record Company albums
Albums recorded at Sunset Sound Recorders